Observatory Hill is the name of several hills around the world including:

 Observatory Hill, Darjeeling, in West Bengal, India
 Observatory Hill, Hong Kong
 Observatory Hill (Pittsburgh), a neighborhood in Pittsburgh, Pennsylvania
 Observatory Hill in Saanich, British Columbia, Canada, the location of the Dominion Astrophysical Observatory
 Observatory Hill (Washington, D.C.), site of the United States Naval Observatory
 Observatory Park, Sydney, New South Wales, Australia, also known as Observatory Hill
 Tähtitorninvuori ("Observatory Hill"), a hill and park in Helsinki, Finland